Valido is a surname. Notable people with the surname include:

 Alexis Valido (born 1976), Spanish volleyball player
 Agustín Valido (1914–1998), Argentine footballer
 Pedro Valido (born 1970), Portuguese footballer and coach

See also
 Favourite